Teng Bin (born 24 July 1985) is a Chinese former footballer.

Career statistics

Club

Notes

References

1985 births
Living people
Chinese footballers
Association football midfielders
Singapore Premier League players
Chinese Super League players
Shanghai Shenxin F.C. players